The Freie Berliner Kunstausstellung (FBK), the “Free Berlin Art Exhibition” in Berlin (Germany), was “unique in its structure”. For 24 years, from 1971 to 1995, it was the only non-juried art exhibition of its size in Europe. It opened after the Große Berliner Kunstausstellung, the “Grand Berlin Art Exhibition”, a juried art exhibition, had closed its doors. Supported by the Senate of Berlin, an association, called the Freie Berliner Kunstausstellung was registered in 1970 with the goal to organize annual exhibitions. Hans-Joachim Zeidler became chairperson of this association for the first four years, followed by Ernst Leonhardt (Artist). During the association's last four years, Karin Rech took over the leadership.

History 

The first FBK took place in the exhibition halls at the Funkturm Berlin in 1971. At that time, the so-called Counterculture of the 1960s movement was already in full swing. The unrest of this period had inspired many social groups, and artists as well were “woken up”, as Zeidler reported in his review in 1983.  Already at its beginning, the FBK was able to “look back on a Berlin tradition that was dating back to the Weimar Republic.” However, early evidence of non-juried art exhibitions points to the 19th century. A poster collection at the Germanisches Nationalmuseum contains a poster by Ludwig von Hofmann. The draft of this poster – which he had originally designed in 1893 for the first Große Berliner Kunstausstellung – was rejected. The portrayal of a “sparsely clad young man was apparently seen as an offense and was removed by the Berlin police, according to contemporary reports.” As some artists had been rejected by the jury of the Große Berliner Kunstausstellung, a second exhibition, which had called itself FBK, was organized, running concurrently with the Große Berliner Kunstausstellung. Its location was close by, across the road at the Moltke Bridge. It accepted Ludwig von Hofmann's poster. Käthe Kollwitz, who was still an unknown artist at that time, exhibited in 1895 in the FBK which had always been seen as an alternative to the juried art exhibitions.

In addition to these early historical roots, the Non-Juried Art Exhibition featured a direct predecessor in 1965, as mentioned in the archives of the Association of Female Artists of Berlin. After the FBK had presented its first exhibition in 1971, it took 12 years for an acting mayor of Berlin to officially comment on the exhibition. Such comments had been anticipated for years. In 1983 Richard von Weizsäcker was the first mayor who was willing to write words of acknowledgement. Since then greetings from the acting mayor of Berlin became a tradition.

For the first time in 1990, after what was called Die Wende – after the fall of the Berlin Wall but before German reunification – Walter Momper, mayor of Berlin at that time, congratulated the FBK, hoping for “satisfied artists and many interested visitors from East and West”. In 1991 the time had come to announce: “The 21st FBK is finally a free exhibition for all artists of Berlin.”

From the very beginning, the “fiercely controversial but hotly loved” FBK faced criticism, sometimes there was even harsh rejection. The critics turned against the concept of a non-juried exhibition, as well as the inclusion of anyone who wanted to exhibit. This allowed “young, unknown, perhaps also ‘not so good’ artists, such as hobby artists, to participate.” Many rejected this concept. Leonhardt pointed out the “charm of the FBK” and stressed that for some it was “a spring-board to a great career”. For Nicole Bröhan, the “always controversial mixture of professional and amateur artists […] created its special appeal”. In 1994 she wrote in the Berliner Zeitung that she saw the FBK as “talent forging”. Despite all the positive reports, the FBK's continued existence was always at risk. “What a triumph! The FBK, which is dead at least once every year, will turn 25. Who would have thought?” With these words, Ernst Leonhardt, meanwhile honorary chairman of the association, began his review at the FBK's 25th anniversary. He could not know at that time that, due to the financial situation, it would be the last opening of the FBK. For that exhibition to take place at all, there was an “art auction during which 1,000 works donated by Berlin artists were auctioned off” – “in order to support the exhibition”.

Organization 

Unlike the usual concepts of exhibitions, the goal of the FBK was for the artists themselves, not professional gallery owners or curators, to take over management and organization of the exhibition, as well as the hanging of the art works. A jury did not exist. Organizer of the exhibitions was the registered association of the FBK. The management of the exhibitions was led by the respective chairperson of the association, while the organizational aspects were handled by a group of seven members. The preparation and execution of the exhibitions was coordinated by the "Colleagues of the Management". As a rule, the FBK took place in the second quarter of each year. Around Christmas the year before, registration forms were sent to the artists.

Two divisions were set up, a Free Division and a division for groups. The former consisted of professional artists only, the latter of non-professional artists who joined as groups. Among the many exhibiting artist groups were diverse artist associations, as well as students from the Berlin University of the Arts, which regularly exhibited as a large group of their own.

The usually not conflict-free process of hanging the art work was organized based on its own concept. A “Hanging Commission” was set up for the Free Division. It was the commission's responsibility to find a suitable place for about 1,200 works of art within three days. The groups were each assigned a location appropriate to their size in which they arranged the hanging themselves.

Two-thirds of the exhibitors were professional artists, one third ‘hobby artists’. At the 20th anniversary of the exhibition, the chairman expressed satisfaction that the Free Division and the groups were now “finally equal” in the allocation of space. Among the celebrities of the exhibitors were Louise Rösler, Walter Stöhrer, Fred Thieler and Jürgen Draeger. The latter presented on his website several cover pages of the catalogs. While for almost 20 years male artists were overrepresented, the gender distribution was balanced for the first time in 1990 – “without any quotation”, as Walter Momper acknowledged in his greeting. In 1991 about 300 artists from the Eastern part of Berlin took part for the first time.

Despite financial difficulties, the FBK provided a catalog for all the exhibitions. These catalogs were printed on high-quality paper with support from the Berlin printing company Ruksal. From 1987 on, the catalogs were supplemented by a hall plan which made it easier to find the artists in the Free Division as well as in the groups.

Exhibition 
For four weeks each year, between April and June, the FBK organizers opened the doors of the exhibition halls at the Funkturm Berlin and invited the public. “Drawings, pictures, spatial as well as sound and video installations, sculptures, collages, photography” were presented. In addition to depressive performances, there were also humorous inventions, such as a potency automat (1986) or an art licensing machine(1989). Over the years, not only the exhibition itself, but also the accompanying program developed. Prints and small sculptures were sold in a bazaar. On Saturdays there were guided tours. A traditional breakfast with jazz music and discussions enjoyed increasing popularity. A Kinderatelier (children's art room) was open daily where children, guided by artists, could paint. While the program changed at times, there were special readings by women, or “music played on historical instruments”. The exhibition management was also interested in the outer appearance of the exhibition halls. A proposal for a flag project was repeatedly turned down by the Senate. Eventually the artists financed the project at their own expense. In 1989 “the visitors of the 19th FBK were greeted at the entrance to the exhibition halls by 70 colourful flags [...], which had never been shown before”. In 1991, as in previous years, a “graphic competition for students of the Berlin University of the Arts” was organized. In 1992, the project began with picture panels, 30 large-format paintings on the outside of the exhibition halls, designed to “catch the eye”. For the first time in 1993, art discussions were held in which artists and visitors alike participated. They took place every day, with the aim to encourage “thinking with one's eyes”. A five-minute-long video, published on YouTube on October 5, 2010, highlights events of the 19th FBK. It provides an impression of the atmosphere typical of the  exhibitions.

Media 
The media-echo was slow in coming. In 1983 – twelve years after the FBK's opening – Leonhardt still expressed hope “that the media would finally provide stronger support to this exhibition”. In 1990 he was able to report that “the acceptance we have recently received from the media was positive and seems to continue to be so.” The Berliner Morgenpost which had already devoted a full, richly illustrated page regarding the FBK, was also reporting regularly.

Finances 
Besides numerous sponsors and catalog advertisers, the FBK was financed by the Senate of Berlin. Over the course of about 20 years, from 1971 to 1993, its budget had grown steadily from 120,000 Deutsche Mark (DM) to over 760,000 DM. During that period, from 1981 to 1983, the budget of the FBK had been fixed and was slightly reduced in 1984. Well-known companies of the city helped fill the gaps. Senator Volker Hassemer secured the budget in 1985 which increased during the following eight years. The rent also increased considerably over the years and amounted to nearly 400,000 DM in 1995, leaving only 360,000 DM of the Senate's grants for the realization of the exhibition. This exhibition would not have been possible without donations from the artists. A year later the Senate stopped the grants entirely. That decision sealed the end of the FBK. During the jubilee exhibition in 1995 the organizers assumed that – while budget cuts had to be made – the FBK could still take place every second year, in a “2-year rhythm”, as the former cultural director Ulrich Roloff-Momin had stated. Nothing came out of it. There were appeals, some of them were drastic:

Figures 
The figures presented here are incomplete. A first overview was published in the catalog of the 20th FBK relating to the years 1971 to 1989, and a second one in the catalog of the 24th FBK for the years 1991 to 1993. Thus, there is no information about 1990 and the last two years.

In the documented period – between 1983 and 1989 – the number of exhibitors increased from 750 to 2,400, with certain fluctuations. The number of groups involved rose from 25 to 82 and peaked with 91 groups in 1992. The number of visitors varied between 12,400 and 34,000 with a high in 1978. The grants made available by the Senate of Berlin for the organization and the set-up of the exhibition increased more or less continuously from 150,000 DM to more than 750,000 DM in 1993. In addition, there were not only sponsors, but also artists who sold their art to cover expenses of the exhibition. Nevertheless, money was always scarce, as Ernst Leonhardt's constantly admonishing words in the catalogs testify. The exhibition space had increased over the years to 9,000 square meters but the rent increased as well. It multiplied sixfold from the beginning to the last exhibition.

With the exception of the first two years, the number of art works that were sold increased consistently and grew steadily to a 6-figure sum, just under half a million in 1992. Yet, Leonhardt regrets: “Not more than about 5 % of the visual artists can support themselves through their work.” There were discussions about the often modest purchases of art works by the Senate of Berlin which were in the single-digit percentage range of the budget for art purchases.“Ridiculous, the disillusioned say, that of a 670,000 DM budget less than 5 % was purchased at the FBK, even though the Senator himself considers this exhibition to be the most important of the year in Berlin.”

Artists (selection) 
Shahla Aghapour – Friedrich Ahlers-Hestermann – Günter Anlauf – Manfred Beelke – Wolfgang Bier – Gisela von Bruchhausen – Franziskus Dellgruen – Jürgen Draeger – Otto Drengwitz – Rainer Fetting – Hans-Jürgen Gaudeck – Harald Gnade – Arwed D. Gorella – Ingrid Hartlieb – Ilja Heinig – Irene Herre – Jörg Hoffmann (Sculptor) – Thomas Hornemann – Peter Robert Keil – Matthias Koeppel – Ingo Kühl – Dietmar Lemcke – Ernst Leonhardt – Dieter Masuhr – Reinhard Matz – Louise Rösler – Karl-Ludwig Sauer – Gerhard Scheibe – Vera Solymosi-Thurzó – Christian W. Staudinger – Walter Stöhrer – Herbert Strässer – Fred Thieler – Rainer M. Thurau – Klaus Tober – Heino D. Tripmacker – Klaus Vogelgesang – Jürgen Waller – Helmut Wolff (Artist) – Karlheinz Ziegler (Painter) – Hans-Joachim Zeidler

Managers and Organizers

References and Remarks

External links 
 Catalogs of the FBK at Deutschen Nationalbibliothek (DNB) 

Art exhibitions in Germany
Annual events in Berlin